Balaban may refer to:

Places

Azerbaijan

 Balaxanı, Azerbaijan, formerly Balaban

Iran

 Balaban, Khoy (Persian: , Balabān)
 Balaban, Piranshahr (Persian: , Bālābān)

Syria
 Balaban is a village in northern Aleppo Governorate, Syria

Turkey
 Balaban, Büyükorhan
 Balaban, Eğil
 Balaban, İzmit, a village in Kocaeli, Turkey

Other uses 

 Balaban (instrument), a double reed wind instrument of the duduk family
 Balaban (surname)
 Balaban and Katz, an American corporation

See also 
 Balabanov
 Ballabon